EMD-386088 is an indole derivative which is used in scientific research. It acts as a potent 5-HT6 receptor partial agonist, with a Ki of 1 nM, a significantly higher affinity than older 5-HT6 agonists such as EMDT, although it possesses moderate affinity for the 5-HT3 receptor as well. Subsequent research has determined that EMD-386088 is also a dopamine reuptake inhibitor and that this action is involved in the antidepressant-like effects of the drug in rodents.

See also
 EMDT
 ST-1936

References

5-HT6 agonists
Dopamine reuptake inhibitors
Indoles
Tetrahydropyridines
Chloroarenes